Henry James Armstrong (died 23 March 1945 at Sydney, New South Wales) was an Australian cricket Test match umpire.

He umpired one Test match in 1931 between Australia and the West Indies at Sydney on 27 February to 4 March 1931. In this match, in which the West Indies gained their first win over Australia, he was partnered by Walter French. 

He umpired 12 Sheffield Shield matches in Sydney between 1930 and 1937. In the 1930s he served for some years as honorary secretary of the New South Wales Umpires' Association.

He married Essie Hill in November 1911. They had two daughters. He died at their home in Wahroonga, in March 1945.

See also
Australian Test Cricket Umpires
List of Test cricket umpires

References

External links
 

19th-century births
1945 deaths
Australian Test cricket umpires